Goluzino is a rural locality (a village) in Kichmegnskoye Rural Settlement, Kichmengsko-Gorodetsky District, Vologda Oblast, Russia. The population was 72 as of 2002.

Geography 
Goluzino is located 19 km southwest of Kichmengsky Gorodok (the district's administrative centre) by road. Gridenskaya is the nearest rural locality.

References 

Rural localities in Kichmengsko-Gorodetsky District